Risto Mustonen (24 April 1875 – 3 March 1941) was a Finnish wrestler. He was born in Lieksa. He competed in the featherweight event at the 1912 Summer Olympics. He won a bronze medal at the 1921 World Wrestling Championships.

References

External links
 

1875 births
1941 deaths
Olympic wrestlers of Finland
Wrestlers at the 1912 Summer Olympics
Finnish male sport wrestlers
People from Lieksa
Sportspeople from North Karelia
World Wrestling Championships medalists